Shekou Passenger Terminal was a ferry port located in Shekou, Nanshan District, Shenzhen, China. It allowed for direct ferry connections from Shenzhen to destinations across the Pearl River Delta. It was operated by China Merchant Shekou Ferry Terminal Service Co., Ltd. It was also known as Shekou Port Ferry Terminal. It was the waterway passenger transportation junction of Shenzhen. Ferry operations were operated by TurboJET and CKS Ferries.

It has been replaced by the Shekou Cruise Center a.k.a. the new Shekou Ferry Terminal.

Structure
The terminal was built in 1981, and the coastline of the terminal was 1,025m long, there were 16 berths, and covered an area of 25,371m2. It had two ticket halls, three waiting halls (two for HK-Macau line, and one for domestic line) and six service counters for pre-check in.

Destinations
As of 2013, there were 30 ships operating from the terminal, of which 22 are high speed luxury ferries, and 8 are ordinary high speed ferries. These service five scheduled high speed passenger ship lines (namely Shekou to Hong Kong International Airport, Hong Kong, Macau Peninsula, Macau's Taipa Island and Zhuhai) and nonscheduled charter services to Pearl River Delta islands.

Pre-check in service was available for certain flights departing from Hong Kong International Airport, so at Shekou Terminal, passengers can directly get the boarding pass and baggage delivery service for flights taking off from Hong Kong International Airport. Participating airlines are as follows for check-in services:
 All Nippon Airways (NH)
 Cathay Pacific Airways (CX)
 China Airlines (CI)
 EVA Airways (BR)
 Garuda Indonesia (GA)
 Hong Kong Airlines (HX)
 Hong Kong Express Airways (UO)
 Japan Airlines (JL)
 Mandarin Airlines (AE)
 Singapore Airlines (SQ)
 Turkish Airlines (TK)
 United Airlines (UA)

Ground transportation
From the ferry terminal building itself, taxis are available close to the door. A connecting bus depot offers local services across Nanshan but with some services across to Futian and Luohu districts of the city terminating at Shenzhen railway station. Airport Express Line 10 offers quick transfer to Shenzhen Bao'an International Airport. Metro rail services are available beyond the bus depot at the underground Shekou Port station on the Shekou Line.

Future development
Since its original construction, there has been very limited modifications and renovations to the terminal building. It was announced by the operating company, in December 2013, that a major redevelopment will take place. With construction expected to start in 2014, it is expected to take 3 years to complete. The ferry services and facilities are to be greatly expanded and allow for cruise ships to dock at the same facility. The new Shenzhen Prince Bay Cruise Homeport will open on November 1, 2016. It is located 1.5 km south-west of the current ferry terminal with a free shuttle bus connecting the new terminal with the Shekou Port Metro Station. The current ferry terminal will close and demolished as part of further urban renewal and redevelopment works.

References

External links
 Shenzhen Shekou Passenger Terminal

Buildings and structures in Shenzhen
Ferry terminals in China